Mark Warner (born 1954) is a United States senator from Virginia

Mark Warner or Marc Warner may also refer to:
 Mark Warner (Canadian politician) (born 1964), Canadian politician and lawyer
Mark Warner (film editor) (born 1954), film editor
 Mark Warner (guitarist), Nashville Tennessee session guitarist, songwriter and music producer 
 Mark Warner (House), fictional recurring character from the American television series House
 Mark Warner, Australian guitarist, member of After the Fall
Mark Warner Ltd, British holiday company
 Marc Warner, CEO and co-founder of tech company Faculty

Warner, Mark